("Wedding chorus"), WAB 49, is a wedding song composed by Anton Bruckner on 8 January 1865.

History 
Bruckner composed the setting for the wedding ceremony of his friend Karl Kerschbaum, chairman of the Liedertafel Frohsinn, with Maria Schimatschek, a concert singer and daughter of Franz Schimatschek. The sacred piece was performed by Frohsinn, with Bruckner at the organ, on 5 February 1865 during the celebration of the wedding in the Linzer Stadtpfarrkirche (Linz Parish Church).

The original manuscript is stored in the Frohsinn-archive of the Linzer Singakademie. After this single performance the music fell into oblivion. It was first published in band III/2, pp. 219–224 of the Göllerich/Auer biography.

Text 
The work uses a text by Franz Isidor Proschko.

Music 
The in total 55-bar long work in F major is scored for  choir, voice quartet, and organ. The setting of the first strophe (bars 1 to 17) is sung by the choir. The setting of the second strophe (bars 18 to 38) is sung by the vocal quartet. Thereafter the setting of the first strophe is repeated da capo.

In the newspaper Linzer Zeitung of 8 February 1865 the work was praised as a unique product of a creative spirit (originelle Geistesschöpfung).

Discography 
There are two recordings of the Trauungschor:
 Thomas Kerbl, Chorvereinigung Bruckner 08, Anton Bruckner Männerchöre – CD: LIVA 027, 2008
 * Yoshihiko Iwasa, MGV Tokyo Lieder Tafel 1925 (TLT), MGV Tokyo Lieder Tafel 1925 - CD issued by the choir, 2016

References

Sources 
 August Göllerich, Anton Bruckner. Ein Lebens- und Schaffens-Bild,  – posthumous edited by Max Auer by G. Bosse, Regensburg, 1932
 Anton Bruckner – Sämtliche Werke, Band XXIII/2:  Weltliche Chorwerke (1843–1893), Musikwissenschaftlicher Verlag der Internationalen Bruckner-Gesellschaft, Angela Pachovsky and Anton Reinthaler (Editor), Vienna, 1989
 Cornelis van Zwol, Anton Bruckner 1824–1896 – Leven en werken, uitg. Thoth, Bussum, Netherlands, 2012. 
 Crawford Howie, Anton Bruckner - A documentary biography, online revised edition

External links 
 
  
 Trauungs-Chor F-Dur, WAB 49 Critical discography by Hans Roelofs 

Weltliche Chorwerke by Anton Bruckner
1865 compositions
Compositions in F major